Milo Hrnić (born 3 February 1950) is a Croatian pop singer. His performances are characterised by emotional intensity and frequent crowd interactions. His resonant and forceful baritone and distinct brand of poetic lyrics have proclaimed him as one of the most commercially and critically successful Croatian pop singers. Alongside Tereza Kesovija, he was pronounced "the singer of the century" in his native Dubrovnik.

He won the Split Festival three times: in 1982 with "Vrati se", in 1983 with "Dalmacijo, ljubav si vječna" and in 1987 with "Dobra večer prijatelji".

Political activity
Hrnić is a member of Dubrovnik's city council, originally with the Croatian People's Party (HNS), but now as an independent.

Discography 
1980 – Milo
1981 – Samo ti
1982 – Lutaj pjesmo moja
1983 – Potraži me
1984 – Zagrli me jače
1985 – S tobom sam jači
1987 – Pozovi me
1988 – Ja neću takav život
1989 – Tvoja mati je legla da spava
1990 – Sad sam opet svoj na svome
1992 – Biser Hrvatski
1993 – 20 mojih uspjeha
1994 – Na kominu moga ćaće
1997 – Sve me tebi zove
1999 – Vrijeme ljubavi
2007 – Zlatna kolekcija
2008 – Za sva vremena

References

External links
Milo Hrnić at Diskografija.com

1950 births
Living people
People from Dubrovnik
Croatian pop singers
20th-century Croatian male singers
Croatian baritones
Croatian folk-pop singers
Indexi Award winners